The Lukas Classic Stakes is a Grade II American Thoroughbred horse race for three years old and older, over a distance of  miles on the dirt held annually in September at Churchill Downs, in Louisville, Kentucky.  The event currently carries a purse of $500,000.

History

The race was inaugurated in 2013, as the Homecoming Classic Stakes with a stakes purse of $175,000.

In 2015 the event was renamed to the Lukas Classic Stakes after U.S. Racing Hall of Fame horse trainer D. Wayne Lukas.  Churchill Downs administration indicated that the change of name to Lukas Classic was "to salute Lukas' accomplishments, contributions and influence on Churchill Downs, the Kentucky Derby and Oaks, and the horse industry." Lukas has won the Kentucky Derby and the Oaks four times apiece.

Previously a Listed race, it was upgraded to Grade III status for 2017 by the American Graded Stakes Committee.

In 2020 due to the COVID-19 pandemic in the United States, Churchill Downs did not schedule the event in their updated meeting.

In 2022 the American Graded Stakes Committee upgraded the event to Grade II.

Records
Speed record:
1:47.85 – Knicks Go (2021) 

Margins: 
  lengths – Mind Your Biscuits (2017) & Honorable Duty (2018)

Most wins
 No horse has won this race more than once.

Most wins by a jockey
 2 – Tyler Gaffalione (2018, 2022)

Most wins by a trainer
 No trainer has won this race more than once.

Most wins by an owner
 No owner has won this race more than once.

Winners

See also
 List of American and Canadian Graded races

References

Recurring sporting events established in 2013
Churchill Downs horse races
2013 establishments in Kentucky
Grade 3 stakes races in the United States
Graded stakes races in the United States